Communauté d'agglomération Grand Châtellerault is the communauté d'agglomération, an intercommunal structure, centred on the city of Châtellerault. It is located in the Vienne department, in the Nouvelle-Aquitaine region, western France. Created in 2017, its seat is in Châtellerault. Its area is 1133.9 km2. Its population was 83,615 in 2019, of which 31,487 in Châtellerault proper.

Composition
The communauté d'agglomération consists of the following 47 communes:

Angles-sur-l'Anglin
Antran
Archigny
Availles-en-Châtellerault
Bellefonds
Bonneuil-Matours
Buxeuil
Cenon-sur-Vienne
Cernay
Châtellerault
Chenevelles
Colombiers
Coussay-les-Bois
Dangé-Saint-Romain
Doussay
Ingrandes
Leigné-les-Bois
Leigné-sur-Usseau
Lencloître
Lésigny
Leugny
Mairé
Mondion
Monthoiron
Naintré
Orches
Les Ormes
Ouzilly
Oyré
Pleumartin
Port-de-Piles
La Roche-Posay
Saint-Christophe
Saint-Genest-d'Ambière
Saint-Gervais-les-Trois-Clochers
Saint-Rémy-sur-Creuse
Savigny-sous-Faye
Scorbé-Clairvaux
Senillé-Saint-Sauveur
Sérigny
Sossais
Thuré
Usseau
Vaux-sur-Vienne
Vellèches
Vicq-sur-Gartempe
Vouneuil-sur-Vienne

References

Chatellerault
Chatellerault